Samuel Kamau Macharia (born 1942), also known as S. K. Macharia, is the Kenyan founder and chair of Royal Media Services, the largest private radio and television network in Eastern Africa. He has taken advantage of his wealth to control media in Kenya and has bought so many frequencies that anyone wanting to open a radio station must consult him. The flagship outlets of Royal Media Services are Citizen TV and Radio Citizen. In 2012, Macharia was on the top-10 list in Forbes magazine of African millionaires to watch. Macharia was on the 2013 Africa Report of the 50 most influential Africans. He was honoured with the 2015 Eastern Africa Ernst and Young Entrepreneur Lifetime Achievement Award.

Early life
Macharia was born in Ndakaini Village, Murang'a County in 1942. He had three sisters and was the second born. His parents were squatters in Subukia where they worked on British settler plantations under the colonial government. Macharia's mother died when he was five years old. The family moved to Arusha in Tanzania but his father's attempts at securing employment were unsuccessful. Meanwhile, the young Macharia kept the company of Maasai herds boys and would traverse long distances with them in search of pasture.

Education
Macharia joined Standard 1 in 1954 at Ndakaini Primary School. He was thereafter admitted at Gituru Intermediate School, where he sat for the Kenya African Preliminary Examination (KAPE) in 1958. He taught as an untrained primary school teacher at Makomboki Primary School for a year, before joining Kahuhia Teachers Training College. A two-year course at the college would see him qualify as a trained teacher (P3) and he was subsequently posted to Gituru Primary School in 1961.

He applied for the Kennedy Airlifts and was accepted in the 1962 group. His family could not, however, raise the 4,000 shillings required for the plane ticket to the United States. He could only raise 1,200 shillings and had to travel for nearly two months by road from Kenya to Benghazi, Libya, where he took a ship to England and then a flight to the USA.

On arrival, he enrolled in Seattle Technical College and completed his high school education two years later. Macharia would later earn a Bachelor of Arts degree in Political Science from Seattle Pacific University and a Bachelor of Science degree in Accounting from the University of Washington. He would then complete a Master of Science degree in Accounting/Finance, a Master of Arts degree in Accounting and was certified as a Certified Public Accountant (CPA).

Work
Macharia returned to Kenya in 1969 and was employed as a Provincial Local Government Finance Officer (Supernumerary) in the Ministry of Local Government. He later worked with Industrial and Commercial Development Corporation (ICDC) and Kenya Industrial Estates (KIE). In 1973, he was appointed as head of a taskforce that was charged with auditing and eventually liquidating the Agricultural Development Corporation. However, he convinced the authorities that ADC could be saved and worked on turning around the corporation.

Business

Madhupaper
In 1979, Macharia left the Public Service to run Madhupaper International Kenya Limited, a tissue production company he had started three years earlier. By 1985, Madhupaper had 300 employees and its main product Rosy was becoming a household brand. Madhupaper was the only tissue manufacturer in Kenya at the time. On 25 October 1985, Kenya Commercial Bank placed Madhupaper under receivership in what Macharia believes was political persecution by the Moi government.

Royal Media Services
According to international research firm Ipsos, Citizen TV has a 62.5% share of the Kenyan television market in 2016. Royal Media Services radio stations have a combined audience of 80% of Kenya's population (the main radio station Radio Citizen has a 43% market share). Other brands in the Royal Media Services stable include Inooro TV, Ramogi FM, Inooro FM, Musyi FM, Chamgei FM, Muuga FM, Egesa FM, Bahari FM, Mulembe FM, Wimwaro FM, Sulwe FM, Hot 96 and Vuuka FM.

Personal life
Macharia is married to Purity Gathoni Macharia and they have six children (two girls and four boys). Gathoni is a sister to former Kenyan Cabinet Minister Njeru Githae and Syracuse University professor Micere Githae Mugo.

Awards
 2015 Eastern Africa Ernst and Young Entrepreneur Lifetime Award
 Honorary Doctorate from the University of Nairobi

References

External links
 Royal Media Services Limited

1942 births
Living people
People from Murang'a County
Kenyan business executives